Scheuermann, Scheuerman is surname of:

 Georg Caspar Scheuermann (Schürmann)
 Heidi Scheuermann, a Republican politician
 Holger Scheuermann (1877–1960), a Danish surgeon
 Scheuermann's disease, named after Holger Scheuermann
 See also Kyphosis

See also
 Scheuermann Spur, a broad ice-covered limb of the Darwin Mountains
 Scheuerman
 Scheuer

German-language surnames